Carlos Roberto Atehortúa (born June 27, 1987) is a Colombian football goalkeeper who plays for Millonarios in the Copa Mustang. Atehortúa is a product of the Millonarios youth system and played with the Millonarios first team since September, 2007.

References

1987 births
Living people
Colombian footballers
Millonarios F.C. players
Association football goalkeepers
People from Huila Department